Chandra Aahe Sakshila is an Indian Marathi television Indian soap opera which was aired on Colors Marathi since 11 November 2020. It starred Subodh Bhave, Rutuja Bagwe and Nakshatra Medhekar in lead roles.

Plot 
It is a story of love, deceit and betrayal. Swati is an educated working woman in her early 30s, who meets a seemingly innocent and naive man named Shridhar and falls love with him who lures her into a trap of a various kind. Her life is picture perfect until she finds out the truth.

Cast

Main 
 Subodh Bhave as Shridhar Kale
 Rutuja Bagwe as Swati Gulwani / Swati Shridhar Kale / Swati Sangram Jagtap 
 Nakshatra Medhekar as Suman Shridhar Kale

Recurring 
 Kunjika Kalwit as Priya
 Uma Sardeshmukh as Uma
 Surekha Kudachi as Meena Atya
 Isha Deshpande as Mumu
 Bipin Surve as Ashwin
 Vinita Kale as Madhavi
 Vaishali Bhosale as Mitali Achrekar
 Hemant Dhome as Nanna
 Aastad Kale as Sangram Jagtap
 Yash Pradhan as Dr. Parag Jagtap
 Surabhi Bhave-Damale as Pournima Raikar
 Tushar Joshi

Production

Development
The show is being under the banner of Mulakshar Productions. It is produced by well known actor and director Chinmay Mandlekar with Digpal Lanjekar.

Casting 
Subodh Bhave was selected to play the role of Shridhar Kale. Rutuja Bagwe grabbed opportunity to play Swati Kale. Vaishali Bhosale comeback television after 3 years to play Mitali Achrekar (Shridhar's sister). Aastad Kale also selected for the role of Sangram Jagtap. Nakshatra Medhekar was selected to play the role of Suman Kale i.e. Shridhar's wife.

References

External links
 Chandra Aahe Sakshila at Voot
 

Marathi-language television shows
2020 Indian television series debuts
Colors Marathi original programming
2021 Indian television series endings